Franco de Peña (born 25 March 1966) is a Polish-Venezuelan film director.

Early years and education
Born and raised in Caracas, Venezuela, in 1981 de Peña began studying economics at the Universidad Central de Venezuela, but after two years left Venezuela for Montreal, where he settled. He has been an Invited Artist of the Cannes Film Festival Residence in Paris and the Berlin Kunstler Programme and Nipkow Program in Berlin. De Peña has lived in London, Barcelona before relocating to Poland in 1987. De Peña passed his entrance exams to the Łódź Film School, but had to put his plans on hold. He moved to Warsaw and studied at the Warsaw National Academy of Theatre for two years. He was finally admitted to the Łódź school and graduated in 1997.
Franco De Peña has participated in two MASTER CLASSES organised by the European Film Academy: A Master Class by Mike Newell CREATING A WORLD FOR A STORY and a MASTER CLASS BY ALAIN DEROBE with the participation of Florian Maier and Win Wenders STEREOSCOPIC STORY TELLING, CRAFTING AND SHOOTING STORIES IN 3-D.
Since 2008, De Peña is the happy father of Anne Sophie. (Sophi)

Other activities
Apart from his film career, Franco de Peña also played the role of a journalist seeking the alleged unknown Argentinian son of Witold Gombrowicz in the para-documentary Letter from Argentina by Grzegorz Pacek and in the German Film  "My Sweet Home" by Filippos Tsissos. In addition, he was the author of pictures in the Brazilian documentary Bem-Vindo a São Paulo on Caetano Veloso.

Awards
De Peña has been the recipient of several awards for his films including the Best New Director award at the fifth annual Las Palmas International Film Festival in 2005. His film "Your Name is Justine" was recognized with several festival awards, Your name is Justine received 11 International Awards including those of Montreal, Poznań, and Mons.
In 2006, his film YOUR NAME IS JUSTINE was the Luxembourg submission for the 79th Academy Award for Best Foreign Language Film. http://www.screendaily.com/2-october-2006/119.issue
Unfortunately the film was refused by the Academy of Motion Picture Arts and Sciences because he was a Venezuelan National.
However he was given the PRICE BEST LUXEMBOURG FILM in 2007 Meilleur film de fiction luxembourgeois (Filmpräis 2007) https://web.archive.org/web/20110725182636/http://www.cna.public.lu/actualites/2008/12/fmil_justine/index.html

Filmography
 Może to grzech, że się modlę (Maybe it's sinful to pray, 1993) - a document on a 33-year-old prisoner suffering from AIDS
 Szepty wiatru (The Whispers of the Wind, 1995), on a friendship of an old Andean man with his donkey
 El Porvenir de una Ilusión (The Future of an Illusion; 1997) - a poetic description of dreams of modern inhabitants of Havana
 Amor en concreto (Love in Concrete, 2003) - a sketch of lives of several inhabitants of a modern city
 Masz na imię Justine (Your Name is Justine), 2005, about Mariola, a young Polish woman who elopes with her boyfriend to Germany and finds herself jailed and forced into prostitution.
 Hugo King about the totalitarian mechanism of by Hugo Chávez used to stay in power.

References

  4.- https://web.archive.org/web/20110725182636/http://www.cna.public.lu/actualites/2008/12/fmil_justine/index.html
  5.- https://www.imdb.com/name/nm0210938/awards

External links
 

People from Caracas
Polish film directors
Living people
1966 births